Léo Rooman (28 July 1928 – 17 January 2019) was a Belgian field hockey player. He competed in the men's tournament at the 1952 Summer Olympics.

References

External links
 

1928 births
2019 deaths
Belgian male field hockey players
Olympic field hockey players of Belgium
Field hockey players at the 1952 Summer Olympics